The men's 4 × 400 metres relay at the 2016 IAAF World Indoor Championships took place on March 19 and 20, 2016.

In the first leg of the final, Bahamas' Michael Mathieu was the first to break, keeping Kyle Clemons behind him through the entire leg.  Dylan Borlée from the Borlée Brothers Team, Belgium, held off Jamaica's Ricardo Chambers until just before the handoff.  The USA executed an ideal first handoff, with Clemons just edging ahead of Mathieu on the final straightaway, reaching across the zone to hand off to Calvin Smith Jr. who gained a two-metre lead over Alonzo Russell in the exchange.  From there, USA went unchallenged to the gold medal, continually expanding the lead.  After a short battle with Jamaica's Dane Hyatt, Jonathan Borlée ducked in behind Russell.  Lalonde Gordon also ran a strong leg for Trinidad and Tobago to put them near Borlée at the handoff.  Robin Vanderbemden was the only non-Borlée brother on the Belgian team.  Almost immediately after getting the baton in his right hand, he tangled elbows with Ade Alleyne-Forte, suddenly the Belgian baton was on the ground with Vanderbemden running back into the infield to retrieve it, their race was over and the medal positions established.  With the US 25 metres ahead,  Deon Lendore made an attempt to pass Chris Brown on the anchor leg but the veteran, Masters world record holder Brown held him off.

Results

Heats
First 2 teams of each heat (Q) and the next 2 fastest (q) qualified for the final.

Final
The race started on March 20 at 14:50.

References

4 x 400 metres relay
4 × 400 metres relay at the World Athletics Indoor Championships